Pagodar-e Amjaz (also Romanized as Pāgodār-e Amjaz; also known as Pāgdār, Pāgodār, Pagodar, and Pākdār) is a village in Amjaz Rural District, in the Central District of Anbarabad County, Kerman Province, Iran. At the 2006 census, its population was 58, in 11 families.

References 

Populated places in Anbarabad County